Japanese missions to Sui China represent a lens for examining and evaluating the relationship between the Sui dynasty and Japan in the 7th century.  The nature of these bilateral contacts evolved gradually from political and ceremonial acknowledgment to cultural exchanges; and the process accompanied the growing commercial ties which developed over time.

Between 607 and 838, Japan sent 19 missions to China.  Knowledge was the principal objective of each expedition.  For example: Priests studied Chinese Buddhism.  Officials studied Chinese government.  Doctors studied Chinese medicine.  Painters studied Chinese painting. Approximately one third of those who embarked from Japan did not survive to return home.

See also
 Sinocentrism
 Japanese missions to Tang China
 Japanese missions to Ming China
 Japanese missions to Joseon

Notes

References
 Fogel, Joshua A. (2009). Articulating the Sinosphere: Sino-Japanese Relations in Space and Time. Cambridge: Harvard University Press. ; 
 Nussbaum, Louis Frédéric and Käthe Roth. (2005). Japan Encyclopedia. Cambridge: Harvard University Press. ; 

Ambassadors of Japan to China